Vadera or Vadra is an Indian (Khatri) surname. Notable people with the surname include:
 Jaret Vadera (born 1976), Canadian artist
 Priyanka Vadera (born 1972), Indian politician
 Robert Vadera (born 1969), Indian businessman
 Shriti Vadera, Baroness Vadera (born 1962), British investment banker and politician

Indian surnames
Punjabi-language surnames
Surnames of Indian origin
Hindu surnames
Khatri clans
Khatri surnames